WNOS (1450 AM) is a radio station broadcasting a talk radio format. Licensed to New Bern, North Carolina, it serves the New Bern area. The station is owned by CTC Media Group. In addition to sports talk from Fox Sports Radio, it also carries Westwood One's Dennis Miller show, the self-syndicated Laura Ingraham show, and Salem Media's Michael Medved and Dennis Prager.

History
WHIT signed on in 1942 as the first radio station in Craven County, North Carolina. The letters stood for "Where Hospitality Is Traditional". Later, WHIT was a country station.

In 1982, what was then WJQI "Radio Joy" hired Bill Benjamin, who left after the station was sold the next year. Benjamin was asked in 1988 by investors to manage the station and be one of the owners of what by then was WNOS; the transaction never happened.

References

External links

NOS
New Bern, North Carolina